WNML (990 AM; branded, along with simulcast partner WNML-FM 99.1 MHz, as "99.1 The Sports Animal") is a sports radio station licensed to Knoxville, Tennessee. The station is owned by Cumulus Media and currently affiliated with CBS Sports Radio, switching from affiliations with Yahoo! Sports Radio on January 2, 2013, and serves as the flagship for both the Tennessee Smokies Southern League Baseball radio network, as well as the Tennessee Volunteers' statewide radio network ("The Vol Network").

WNML was first licensed, as WNAV, on November 3, 1922, and is one of the oldest broadcasting stations in the United States.

History

WNAV

The first formal regulations establishing a radio broadcasting service in the United States were adopted by the Department of Commerce effective December 1, 1921, and during the next year over 500 stations were created. A notice in the October 3, 1922, issue of the Knoxville News reported that: "The Peoples' Telephone and Telegraph Company is experimenting with its new radio broadcasting station. If perfected, this will be the first broadcasting station operating in East Tennessee."

Peoples' was a local Knoxville telephone company, and after the initial tests proved successful, it was issued its first station license on November 3, 1922, with the sequentially assigned call letters of WNAV. The News further reported that: "J. C. Duncan, president of the Peoples' Telephone and Telegraph Co., announced Monday that the radio station at the telephone building, Commerce-av had passed the government regulations and is known as WNAV. 'By next Sunday we expect to have a program worked out to be broadcasted,' Duncan said."

In its initial years WNAV had a limited schedule, and after a period of inactivity was deleted in June 1924. However the following April it was relicensed to Peoples' Telephone and Telegraph, again with the WNAV call letters.

WNOX
On August 26, 1925, WNAV's call sign was changed to WNOX. Two months later, in late October 1925, the station was destroyed by a major fire on the roof of Peoples' Telephone and Telegraph, and according to J. C. Duncan the station's $20,000 in equipment was "a total loss". The station was back on the air within a week, transmitting over a 100-watt temporary transmitter, with plans to rebuild the destroyed facility. Later that month it was announced that the rebuilt station would be located atop the Sterchi Brothers building near the Gay Street viaduct.

The early WNAV studios were located in the St. James Hotel, which once stood near the head of Market Square. In June 1928, WNOX was purchased by the Sterchi Brothers furniture chain, which sold the station to Scripps-Howard in 1935, after which the station moved to the Andrew Johnson Hotel on Gay Street, with its main offices located on the hotel's 17th floor. The station's growing studio audiences began causing elevator traffic issues for the Andrew Johnson, however, and the hotel asked the station to move.  WNOX relocated to a small tabernacle building at the north end of Gay Street, where it remained for several years. The station's frequency changed many times, eventually settling at AM 990 in March 1941.

In the 1950s and 1960s, WNOX was home to the popular lunchtime program The Midday Merry-go-Round and weekend program The Tennessee Barndance, which were both influential in the early days of country music.  Legendary station manager Lowell Blanchard hosted the programs for many years in downtown Knoxville, and lunch crowds packed the station's downtown auditorium to see the daily programs.  Seeking a bigger performance area, WNOX moved its studios to Whittle Springs Road in north Knoxville.  The Whittle Springs facility included a large auditorium for live performances, but after the move from downtown, the live musical performances were never the same. Once the crowds diminished, the live performances were called off.

The owners of WNOX also had other, much bigger plans for their new facility on Whittle Springs Road.  In 1955, Scripps-Howard Broadcasting was one of the applicants for the Channel 10 frequency, awarded to Knoxville after the Federal Communications Commission (FCC) reorganized its U.S. TV table of channel allocations in 1952.  So sure of getting the Channel 10 license, the company poured thousands of dollars into the Whittle Springs building to make it a top-notch radio-TV studio combination.  After the FCC awarded the TV license to Jay Birdwell, local owner of WBIR AM and FM in 1956, Scripps-Howard was saddled with a huge studio to ultimately be used just for radio, amid a dwindling live listening audience.  Still, the station remained there for many years, less than two miles from its transmitter site.

The 1960s brought a new era for WNOX.  The station became a popular Top 40 station, and remained that way until the late 1970s, when the station switched to AC.  In the early 1980s, the station was bought again and flipped to country, and WNOX was never the same.

WTNZ
WNOX's historic call letters were changed to WTNZ in 1988.  However, within a few months Dick Broadcasting, at that time operating WIVK (now WKVL) on AM 850, which was limited to daytime-only broadcasting, purchased WTNZ 990 AM, which had a fulltime license.

WIVK
Dick donated the original WIVK on AM 850 to the University of Tennessee. He then renamed WTNZ to WIVK, and began simulcasting the programming of WIVK-FM.  Within a few years, WIVK began experimenting with news/talk programming, eventually phasing into a news/talk format 24/7.

WNOX
From 1997 to 2005 the station returned to using the historic WNOX call letters.

WNML

In 2005 the station adopted a sports format under the call sign of WNML.

References

External links
The Sports Animal's official website
 
 FCC History Cards for WNML (covering 1929-1980 as WNOX)

NML
Sports radio stations in the United States
Cumulus Media radio stations
Radio stations established in 1922
1922 establishments in Tennessee
Radio stations licensed before 1923 and still broadcasting
CBS Sports Radio stations